Widad Riadhi de Bentalha (commonly known as WR Bentalha or simply El safra is an Algerian Championnat National 2 football club based in Bentalha. The club was founded in 1979.

History
The club was demoted from the second division for the newly created 2010–11 season of the Championnat National de Football Amateur due to the professionalisation of the first two divisions in Algeria.

Notable players

References

External links
WR Bentalha profile at dzfoot.com
WR Bentalha profile at soccerway.com

Football clubs in Algeria
Algiers Province
Association football clubs established in 1979
1979 establishments in Algeria